Gerhard Schiller (born 17 April 1949 in Stuttgart) is a West German former swimmer who competed in the 1972 Summer Olympics.

References

1949 births
Living people
German male swimmers
German male freestyle swimmers
Olympic swimmers of West Germany
Swimmers at the 1972 Summer Olympics
Sportspeople from Stuttgart
European Aquatics Championships medalists in swimming
Masters swimmers